Martin Percy is a director of interactive video. He has won a BAFTA British Academy Award, five Webby Awards and a Grand Clio;. He has also received three Emmy nominations, ten Webby nominations and fourteen Webby honorees. (See awards and nominations below). He has created interactive video pieces for the Tate Gallery, Asian Art Museum of San Francisco, British Film Institute and National Theatre, working with people including Ian McKellen, Derek Jacobi, Gordon Ramsay, Julie Walters, Tracey Emin, Jonathan Ross and Malcolm McDowell. (See external links below; all sites have a "credits" page crediting Martin Percy as director.) His interactive video pieces are integral to Tate Tracks, a marketing campaign for the Tate Gallery which won a Gold Lion at the Cannes Lions International Advertising Festival. His work is discussed in an interview with Betsy Isaacson for The Huffington Post. In 2014 he gave a TEDx talk about his interactive film Lifesaver.

Martin is a graduate of King's College, Cambridge, and an executive academy member of the International Academy of Digital Arts and Sciences. He is the son of the late Graham Percy, a noted illustrator.

Awards and nominations
 Virry (2015)
BAFTA British Academy Award 2015 - 'Children's Interactive: Original' - winner
Webby Awards - 'Family & Kids (Mobile Sites & Apps)', 2015 - People's Choice Winner

 Lifesaver with Charlotte King, Navinder Bhatti and Daisy Ridley (2013)
Clio Awards 'Healthcare - App', 2013 - winner, Grand Clio
BAFTA British Academy Award 2013 - 'Children's Interactive' - nominee
Webby Awards - 'Education & Reference (Handheld)', 2014 - People's Choice Winner
Webby Awards - 'Health, Wellness, Pharmaceutical', 2014 - Nominee
Webby Awards - 'Health', 2013 - Nominee
Creative Review The Annual, 2014 - Best in Book
FWA Site of the Month - August 2013
FWA Site of the Day - August 14, 2013
SXSW Interactive Awards 2014 - 'Educational Resource' - finalist 
Lovie Awards - 'Best Use of Interactive Video', 2013 - gold winner
Lovie Awards - 'People’s Choice, Best Use of Interactive Video', 2013 - winner
E-Learning Awards - 'Best learning game', 2013 - gold winner
E-Learning Awards - 'Excellence in learning content – public', 2013 - gold winner
E-Learning Awards - 'Excellence in learning content – not for profit', 2013 - gold winner
E-Learning Awards - 'Best use of mobile learning', 2013 - gold winner

 Jameson 1780 (2011)
Webby Awards - 'Best Use of Interactive Video', 2012 - Winner
Webby Awards - 'People’s Choice, Best Use of Interactive Video', 2012 - Winner
Webby Awards - 'Best Use of Video', 2012 - Honoree
FWA Site of the Day - December 27, 2011

 Tate Kids: Wondermind (2011)
Webby Awards - 'Youth', 2012 - Nominee
Webby Awards - 'Best Use of Interactive Video', 2012 - Honoree
FWA Site of the Day - February 12, 2012

 The Asian Art Museum of San Francisco: The Bali Temple Explorer (2011)
Webby Awards - 'Travel & Adventure', 2011 - Winner
Webby Awards - 'Tourism', 2011 - Honoree
Webby Awards - 'Religion & Spirituality', 2012 - Honoree
FWA Site of the Day - July 19, 2011

 Tate Kids: Barbara's Garden (2010)
Webby Awards - 'Broadband', 2010 - Nominee

 Tate Kids: The Secret Dancer (2009)
BAFTA British Academy Award 2010 - 'Children's Interactive' - nominee
Webby Awards - 'Best Use of Interactive Video', 2010 - Nominee
British Interactive Media Association BIMA Awards 2010 - Arts & Culture

 Tate Modern: Street Art HD (2008)
Emmy Awards - New Approaches To News & Documentary Programming: Arts, Lifestyle & Culture 2009 - Nominee
Webby Awards - 'Best Use of Interactive Video', 2009 - Nominee
Webby Awards - 'Broadband', 2009 - Honoree
Webby Awards - 'Cultural Institutions', 2009 - Honoree

 Tate Modern: The One That Spoke to Me (2008)
Emmy Awards - New Approaches To News & Documentary Programming: Arts, Lifestyle & Culture 2009 - Nominee
Webby Awards - 'Art', 2009 - Honoree

Meyers Hill (2008)
Webby Awards - 'Best Use of Interactive Video', 2009 - Honoree

Derek Jacobi on The GPO Film Unit (2008)
Webby Awards - 'Best Use of Interactive Video', 2009 - Honoree

Tate Tracks (2007)
Cannes Lions International Advertising Festival 'Integrated' 2007 - Gold Lion (Campaign)
The One Show - "Best of Show" 2007 (Campaign)
The One Show - Innovative Use of Media - TV - "Gold Pencil" 2007 (Campaign)
Webby Awards - 'Music' 2008 - Honoree (Website)
Webby Awards - 'Cultural Institutions' 2008 - Honoree (Website)
Webby Awards - 'Broadband' 2008 - Honoree (Website)

A Conversation with Sir Ian McKellen (2006)
BAFTA British Academy Award 2006 - 'Interactive Innovation' - nominee
Emmy Awards - 'Outstanding Arts, Lifestyle & Culture Programming For Broadband' 2007 - nominee
Webby Awards - 'Documentary: Individual Episode' 2008 - nominee
Webby Awards - 'Broadband' 2008 - nominee
Webby Awards - 'Cultural Institutions' 2008 - nominee
Webby Awards - 'Best Use of Interactive Video', 2009 - nominee

 Tate Modern - the BT Series featuring Tracey Emin, Rachel Whiteread and Anthony Gormley (2006)
Webby Awards - 'Art' 2006 - nominee
Webby Awards - 'Art' 2007 - honoree
IVCA Awards - 'Web TV' 2007 - silver

 BFI Archive interactive with Malcolm McDowell, Jonathan Ross and Paul Merton (2005-6)
British Interactive Media Association Awards - 'Education' 2006 - nominee

 "Let's Play 66" video quiz
Webby Awards - 'Broadband' 2005 - honoree

References

External links

Official
MartinPercy.com

Lectures etc.
 5-Word Speech given at the 16th Annual Webby Awards for Jameson1780, May 2012.
 Talk on The Internet Filmmaker's Manifesto given at Internet Week Europe, November 2011.
 5-Word Speech given at the 15th Annual Webby Awards for The Bali Temple Explorer, June 2011.
 Transcript of talk on The Genres of Interactive Filmmaking given at The London College of Communication, London, January 2010.
 Summary of talk given to The British Screen Advisory Council, London, April 2008.
 Summary of talk at The Creator's Series, New York, June 2007. Another summary.
 Photo at LIFE.com of Martin Percy giving keynote at Digital Conference, American Film Market, Santa Monica, November 2007.

Interviews
 Online Video Could Be So Much Better -- Just Ask Martin Percy Interview by Betsy Isaacson for The Huffington Post.
 QKSTRM: Martin Percy Wonderland Award interview with Martin Percy.
 Interview re: McKellen BT Archives interview with Martin Percy about interactive video made for the Royal National Theatre with Ian McKellen
 Interview re: McDowell BT Archives interview with Martin Percy about interactive video made for the British Film Institute with Malcolm McDowell
 Interview re: Emin BT Archives interview with Martin Percy about interactive video made for Tate Online with Tracey Emin

Articles etc.
 The Internet Native Filmmaker's Manifesto, by Martin Percy for Contagious (magazine), May 2011. Accessed: 13:36, 3 November 2015 (UTC).
 TV and video games: are they coming together?, by Martin Percy for the Research Institute for Digital Media & Content at Keio University, February 2006. Accessed: 13:36, 3 November 2015 (UTC).
 The future of advertising and branded content, by Martin Percy for the Research Institute for Digital Media & Content at Keio University, February 2006. Accessed: 13:36, 3 November 2015 (UTC).
 On interactive video (subscribers only), by Martin Percy for Broadcast (magazine), February 2007.
 Discretion goes a long way (subscribers only), by Martin Percy for Brand Strategy Magazine, July 2007. On sponsored content.
 Broadcast model that left everyone equally frustrated, letter by Martin Percy in The Financial Times, July 3, 2007.
 Stop Making Sense letter by Martin Percy in Wired (magazine), February 25 08.
 Alarmist claims on ultra-violent games don't fit online technology, letter by Martin Percy in The Financial Times, May 13, 2008.

Alumni of King's College, Cambridge
Living people
Year of birth missing (living people)